Chengtanjiang Town is a suburban town under the administration of Liuyang City, Hunan Province, People's Republic of China. The town shares a border with Hehua Subdistrict to the northwest, Jingang Town to the southwest, Jinshan Town of Shangli County to the south, Wenjiashi Town to the southeast, Zhonghe Town to the east, and Gaoping Town to the north.

History
In 1995, Dasheng Township and Shanxia Township merged to form Chengtanjiang Town.

Administrative divisions
The town is divided into eight villages and two communities: 
 Jizhen Community
 Huaishu Community
 Wutian Village
 Huxing Village
 Dasheng Village
 Bixi Village
 Zhoutian Village
 Jingping Village
 Daping Village
 Hejia Village

Economy
The town's main industries are agriculture, fireworks and coal resources.

Geography
The Nanchuan River flows through the town.

Zhangcao Reservoir is the largest reservoir and largest water body in the town.

Education
 Chengtanjiang Middle School

Transportation

Provincial Highway
The Provincial Highway S310 passes across the town west to east.

County Road
The County Road X006 runs north–south through the town.

References

External links

2000 Census information from 

Divisions of Liuyang
Liuyang